McKinleyville (formerly Minorsville) is a census-designated place (CDP) in Humboldt County, California McKinleyville is located  north of Arcata, at an elevation of . The population was 15,177 at the 2010 census, up from 13,599 at the time of the 2000 census. 

This unincorporated community is the third largest community, after Eureka and Arcata, on the far North Coast. It is also the location of the Arcata–Eureka Airport, the largest airport in Humboldt County and the region.

History
The Wiyot and Yurok people continue to live here in their traditional territories and both groups are ingrained within the McKinleyville community.

McKinleyville is a community made up of a combination of smaller settlements. Joe Dows settled in the general area in the 1860s and that area was known as Dows Prairie. Slightly south was a small community called Minor (also known as Minorville). Minor was first settled in the late 19th century. Just south of Minor was Calville. Calville was settled by the employees of the California Barrel Company. After President William McKinley was assassinated in 1901, the community of Minor changed its name to McKinleyville in his honor. All three areas are collectively considered to be part of McKinleyville.

The first post office at McKinleyville opened in 1903, closed in 1921, and was reopened in 1955.

McKinleyville is a community with mainly retail and professional businesses to serve its residents but is not an incorporated city or town.

Geography

McKinleyville consists of several watershed areas. The north bank of the Mad River is the farthest watershed to the south. The next watershed to the north is Mill Creek, then Widow White Creek, Norton Creek, Strawberry Creek, Patrick Creek and finally the farthest watershed to the north is the south bank of the Little River. To the west lies the Pacific Ocean.

Climate

The area sees summers that are not as foggy as Eureka and Arcata to the south, and run a few degrees warmer.
McKinleyville has a cool-summer Mediterranean climate (Köppen Csc) typical of the North Coast that is characterized by mild, rainy winters and cool, mild summers, with an average temperature of 55°F (13 °C). The area experiences coastal influence fog all year round.

Demographics

2010
The 2010 United States Census reported that McKinleyville had a population of 15,177. The racial makeup of McKinleyville was 13,010 (85.7%) White, 103 (0.7%) African American, 700 (4.6%) Native American, 211 (1.4%) Asian, 17 (0.1%) Pacific Islander, 338 (2.2%) from other races, and 798 (5.3%) from two or more races. Hispanic or Latino of any race were 1,081 persons (7.1%).

The Census reported that 15,098 people (99.5% of the population) lived in households, 79 (0.5%) lived in non-institutionalized group quarters, and 0 (0%) were institutionalized.

There were 6,283 households, out of which 1,979 (31.5%) had children under the age of 18 living in them, 2,784 (44.3%) were opposite-sex married couples living together, 691 (11.0%) had a female householder with no husband present, 386 (6.1%) had a male householder with no wife present. There were 619 (9.9%) unmarried opposite-sex partnerships, and 58 (0.9%) same-sex married couples or partnerships. 1,731 households (27.6%) were made up of individuals, and 515 (8.2%) had someone living alone who was 65 years of age or older. The average household size was 2.40. There were 3,861 families (61.5% of all households); the average family size was 2.94.

The population was spread out, with 3,452 people (22.7%) under the age of 18, 1,349 people (8.9%) aged 18 to 24, 4,306 people (28.4%) aged 25 to 44, 4,189 people (27.6%) aged 45 to 64, and 1,881 people (12.4%) who were 65 years of age or older. The median age was 36.3 years. For every 100 females, there were 95.9 males. For every 100 females age 18 and over, there were 93.6 males.

The homeowner vacancy rate was 1.1%; the rental vacancy rate was 2.7%. 9,459 people (62.3% of the population) lived in owner-occupied housing units and 5,639 people (37.2%) lived in rental housing units.

2000
As of the census of 2000, there were 13,599 people, 5,277 households, and 3,604 families residing in the CDP. The racial makeup of the CDP was 87.64% White, 0.38% Black or African American, 4.56% Native American, 1.07% Asian, 0.06% Pacific Islander, 1.66% from other races, and 4.63% from two or more races. 4.33% of the population were Hispanic or Latino of any race.

There were 5,277 households, out of which 34.5% had children under the age of 18 living with them, 50.9% were married couples living together, 12.1% had a female householder with no husband present, and 31.7% were non-families. 21.7% of all households were made up of individuals, and 7.0% had someone living alone who was 65 years of age or older. The average household size was 2.58 and the average family size was 3.01.

In the CDP, the population was spread out, with 26.4% under the age of 18, 9.5% from 18 to 24, 30.9% from 25 to 44, 22.5% from 45 to 64, and 10.8% who were 65 years of age or older. The median age was 35 years. For every 100 females, there were 95.9 males. For every 100 females age 18 and over, there were 90.4 males.

The median income for a household in the CDP was $38,047, and the median income for a family was $42,926. Males had a median income of $35,395 versus $24,385 for females. The per capita income for the CDP was $17,870. About 11.7% of families and 14.9% of the population were below the poverty line, including 15.9% of those under age 18 and 5.1% of those age 65 or over.

Governance
McKinleyville is an unincorporated community served by the County of Humboldt and the McKinleyville Community Services District.

Transportation

Land
U.S. Route 101 extends north and south through the community. The route lies to the west of the majority of the community and bisects a small portion of the area. State Route 299 connects to U.S. Route 101 at the northern end of the nearby city of Arcata. SR 299 begins at that point and extends easterly to serve as the major traffic artery to the east for the community of McKinleyville. SR 200 also falls within the area, on the southernmost area of the city, letting drivers get to SR 299 without needing to get to US 101.

Humboldt Transit Authority (HTA) is the major provider of public bus transportation in McKinleyville and the county. HTA has several stops in McKinleyville. Dial-A-Ride service is available from Humboldt Senior Resource Center through an application process, and ticket strips can be purchased at the McKinleyville Senior Center.

At times, vehicle traffic into and out of McKinleyville has been restricted due to landslides on the U.S. routes. A magnitude 7.0 earthquake on November 8, 1980, caused a freeway overpass at Tompkins Hill, just south of Eureka, to partially collapse.

Hammond Trail
Following the historic Hammond Lumber Company railroad grade, the trail begins at the Hammond Bridge – which crosses the Mad River near the Mad River County Park – and extends north to Clam Beach County Park just south of Little River State Beach. There is an overnight campground at Clam Beach County Park.

The Hammond Trail is also a recreation and transportation corridor traveling through rural and suburban areas of Humboldt County and is a part of both the California Coastal Trail (CCT) and the Pacific Coast Bike Route (PCBR).

Air
The Arcata–Eureka Airport is a full-service airport located in McKinleyville. The name of the airport comes from the names of the primary population centers that it serves. The location of this airport was chosen to serve as an experimental field to test landing during heavy fog conditions. Due to weather patterns and geographic conditions, the area is one of the foggiest in Northern California.

Amenities
 Clam Beach Run
 Pony Express Days (known temporarily as the Azalea Festival from 2005 to 2008)
Parks in McKinleyville include Azalea State Reserve, Pierson Park, Hiller Park and Clam Beach County Park.

The beach at Clam Beach County Park was named California's most polluted beach in a 2017 study by an environmental nonprofit.

Six Rivers Brewery
McKinleyville has a restaurant that brews its own beer, the Six Rivers Brewery. The brewery makes eleven beers, which are distributed as far away as San Diego and Portland, Oregon. In 2010, it became the second exclusively female-owned brewery in California. Six Rivers won awards at the 2004 and 2005 Great American Beer Festival.

Notable residents

 John Jaso, Major League Baseball catcher

References

External links

 The McKinleyville Press

Populated coastal places in California
Census-designated places in Humboldt County, California
Census-designated places in California